The article lists all the urban local bodies, covering municipal corporations, municipalities and nagar panchayats in the Indian state of Telangana. The statistical data is based on the 2011 Census of India, conducted by The Office of the Registrar General and Census Commissioner, under the Ministry of Home Affairs, Government of India. Some of the Nagar Panchayats were upgraded to municipalities in 2011.

Municipal Corporations 

The state of Telangana has a total of 13 municipal corporations.

Source:
 Population 2011  The Registrar General & Census Commissioner, India. Retrieved 27 March 2018

Cantonment Boards 

The state of Telangana has one Cantonment Board in Hyderabad Dist

Municipalities 

The state of Telangana has a total of 128 municipalities.

Source: 
 Statistical Year Book
 Statistical Information of ULBs and UDAs
 Commissioner and Directorate of Municipal Administration

References 

Lists of populated places in Telangana
Telangana-related lists
Local government-related lists